The Hunterian Society, founded in 1819 in honour of the Scottish surgeon John Hunter (1728–1793), is a society of physicians and dentists based in London.

Established by Dr William Cooke, a general practitioner, and Thomas Armiger, a surgeon, who both practiced in the City of London and the East End of London, the Society has devoted its activities for nearly two hundred years towards the pursuit of medical knowledge and learning. Meetings are always held over dinner, which precedes the subject for debate.

Between 1815 and 1828, Sir William Blizard (1743–1835), who was a former pupil of John Hunter, praised Hunter at the Royal College of Surgeons of England in three Hunterian Orations, and it is believed to be due to his influence that the new Society adopted the name 'Hunterian', rather than 'The London Medical and Physical Society', which was the name first proposed for it.

Blizard became the Society's first President and had the aim of keeping it within the Hunterian tradition. In an oration of 1826, he said: "May the honoured name of Hunter ever have a magic influence on the minds of its members".

The Society promotes an annual oration and awards an annual medal.

Hunterian Society Oration

According to the rules of the society: "The Annual Oration, to be called the Hunterian Society Oration, shall be delivered by the Orator for the current session, at a Meeting of the Society. The primary purpose of the Oration is to Commemorate the life and work of John Hunter, as also of his brother William Hunter, and to set forth the influence of the Hunterian example and tradition in the development of the science and art of Medicine. This tradition includes exact observation, experiment, and the application of anatomical and physiological science, human and comparative, to practical Medicine. It is not intended to exclude from the scope of the Annual Oration topics bearing upon the History of Medicine, and upon the relation of Medicine to other sciences and to human life in its widest sense, as well as other topics which cannot suitably be made the subject of an ordinary medical communication"..

Not to be confused with the Hunterian oration at the Royal College of Surgeons of England.

Orators

Source of names 1826–1907 : Hunterian Society

Hunterian Society awards
The awards of the Society are the Hunterian Medal, the Hunterian Scholarship(s) and the Hunterian Prize and are awarded as the discretion of the Council.

The Hunterian Medal shall be awarded at the discretion of Council from time to time to an individual who is judged to have made an outstanding contribution to the Science and Practice of Medicine.

The Hunterian Scholarship: to assist with the fees and examination for the History of Medicine Course of the Worshipful Society of Apothecaries of London, shall be awarded at the discretion of Council from time to time to a fully registered, non-Consultant grade doctor, dentist, medical scientist, medical student or dental student on the basis of the submission of a dissertation with some relevance to John or William Hunter or medicine in the 18th century.

The Hunterian Prize: The Society awards an annual prize of £500, to a student or practitioner of non-consultant grade in medicine or dentistry or a medical scientist, on the basis of an essay which may be modern but should have a Hunterian flavour. The shortlisted essays will be given as presentations to a meeting of the Society at Lettsom House.

Hunterian Prize winners:

 2012 - Ian Alberts
 2013 - Hutan Ashrafian
 2014 - Emma Stapleton
 2015 - Charlotte Whittingham, Aimee Rowe, Rajiv Dave (joint winners)
 2016 - (no award made)
 2017 - Mark McKelvie
 2018 - Jake Suett
 2019 - Mae-Sing Lim-Cooke, Nadine McCauley (joint winners)
 2020 - Tamari Nyakunengwa 'John Hunter's unsung contribution to Obstetric Medicine'. Runners-up: Paul Williams, Anthony Yip, Sen Tan

Presidents
Source for 1819-1906: Hunterian Society

Bibliography
 Findlay, David W. (ed.) The Hunterian Society - a catalogue of its records and collections relating to John Hunter and the Hunterian Tradition with a history of the society (London: The Hunterian Society, 1990)

References

External links 
 The Hunterian Society - official web site

1819 establishments in the United Kingdom
Learned societies of the United Kingdom
Organizations established in 1819